Harold Hongju Koh (born December 8, 1954) is an American lawyer and legal scholar who served as the legal adviser of the Department of State in the Obama administration. He was nominated to this position by President Barack Obama on March 23, 2009, and confirmed by the Senate on June 25, 2009.  He left the State Department in January 2013, returning to Yale University as a Sterling Professor of international law. He was elected to the American Philosophical Society in 2007.

Early life and family
Koh was born in Boston, Massachusetts. His parents grew up in Korea under Japanese rule in an area that later became part of North Korea. He has described his family thus:

They grew up under Japanese colonial rule, forbidden to speak Korean or even to use their Korean names. When their country was divided after World War II, my mother and her family were trapped in North Korea. In desperation, they hiked for days to the border to be picked up and were brought back to Seoul. But even there, they lived under dictatorship. For less than a year in the 1960s, (South) Korea enjoyed democracy. My father joined the diplomatic corps. But one day, tanks rolled and a coup d'etat toppled the government, leaving us to grow up in America.

After the coup, Koh's father, legal scholar and diplomat Kwang Lim Koh, was granted asylum in the United States. He moved to New Haven, Connecticut, with his family and took a teaching position at Yale. His wife, Hesung Chun Koh (Harold Koh's mother), had a Ph.D. in sociology and taught at Yale as well—they were the first Asian Americans to teach there.

Harold was struck by polio at age six; he went through "two operations, leg braces, and endless rehabilitation" and as a result still walks with a limp.

Koh has six siblings. Howard Koh—a Harvard University public health professor and former Massachusetts Public Health Commissioner—previously served as the United States Assistant Secretary for Health in the Obama administration. His sister Jean Koh Peters also teaches at Yale Law School.

Koh's wife, Mary-Christy Fisher, is an attorney employed by the Connecticut Veterans Legal Center; they have two children.

Education
Koh graduated in 1971 from the Hopkins School in New Haven; graduated summa cum laude and Phi Beta Kappa from Harvard in 1975 with a degree in Government, before studying at Oxford University as a Marshall Scholar. He graduated cum laude from Harvard Law School in 1980.

Early career and scholarship
Koh clerked for Associate Justice Harry Blackmun on the U.S. Supreme Court from October 1981 through September 1982. In 1982 and 1983, he worked as an associate at Covington & Burling.  From 1983-85, Koh worked as an attorney-adviser to the Office of Legal Counsel (OLC) in the United States Department of Justice during the Reagan Administration.

He joined the Yale Law School faculty in 1985. His students have included John Yoo, with whom he co-authored a paper on "Dollar Diplomacy/Dollar Defense: The Fabric of Economics and National Security Law."  Since 1993 he has been the Gerard C. and Bernice Latrobe Smith Professor of International Law; he became the law school's 15th dean in 2004. From 1985-91, Koh largely devoted himself to writing and teaching. A notable paper Koh wrote was a November 1990 legal brief challenging the first president Bush's contention that he could fight the Gulf War on his own authority. Koh argued that "the Constitution requires the president to 'consult with Congress and receive its affirmative authorization — not merely present it with faits accomplis — before engaging in war.'"

In 1992–93, he led a group of Yale students and human rights lawyers in litigation against the United States government to free Haitian refugees interned at Guantanamo Bay, Cuba. As chronicled in Brandt Goldstein's book, Storming the Court (Scribner 2005), Koh and the plaintiffs prevailed in the case, Haitian Centers Council v. Sale, and the Haitians were released in the spring of 1993. At the same time, Koh and his team of law students argued a related case Sale v. Haitian Centers Council (1993) before the U.S. Supreme Court but the court ruled against them on an 8-1 vote.

Koh is the author of several books, including The National Security Constitution: Sharing Power after the Iran-Contra Affair (Yale University Press,1990); Transnational Legal Problems (with Harry Steiner and Detlev Vagts, Foundation Press, 1994); Deliberative Democracy and Human Rights (with Ronald C. Slye, Yale University Press, 1999); and Transnational Litigation in United States Courts (Foundation Press 2008). He has also written over 175 law review articles and legal editorials. He is a prominent advocate of human rights and civil rights; he has argued and written briefs on a wide number of cases before U.S. appellate courts, and has testified before the U.S. Congress more than a dozen times. He has received numerous awards, medals, and honorary degrees.

Blogger David Lat and George Mason professor David Bernstein (contributing to the Volokh Conspiracy), have described Koh as a "highly partisan Democrat" and claim that he has politically polarized Yale Law School during his tenure as dean. Other observers countered that during his tenure prominent conservatives have been appointed to the Yale Law School faculty, and noted that Koh served in both Republican (Reagan) and Democratic (Clinton) administrations. A group of Yale Conservative Law Students offered a vigorous defense of Koh, noting that "Dean Koh has been very supportive of conservative students and conservative student organizations."

They concluded that "Dean Koh is one of the brightest legal minds of his generation, a credit to the profession we look forward to joining, and an able and effective public servant." On May 4, 2010, the Friends of the Law Library of the Library of Congress presented Koh with their annual award named for George W. Wickersham.

Law reform work
Koh was elected to the American Law Institute in 1992 and was elected to the ALI Council in 2007. He stepped down from the Council when he worked for the Obama administration, but was re-elected to Council when he ended his tenure with the State Department and returned to Yale. He currently serves as a Counselor on the Restatement Fourth, the Foreign Relations Law of the United States, and previously served as an Adviser on the Principles of Transnational Civil Procedure project.

State Department Legal Adviser

Nomination and confirmation
On March 23, 2009, the White House announced Koh's nomination as Legal Adviser to the State Department in the Obama administration, the senior legal adviser to Secretary of State Hillary Clinton. His nomination was generally supported in the Senate and among legal colleagues. The nomination drew criticism from some conservative commentators for his views on international law and its use in American legal analysis and jurisprudence, while drawing support from other conservatives such as Ted Olson and Kenneth Starr as well as Forbes magazine.

Koh has written in support of the practice of using tenets of international law and foreign legal precedent to inform the deliberative process of judicial decision making in the United States, and has described what he has called "transnational jurisprudence" as essential to maintaining a well-ordered international legal system. Arguing that "concepts like liberty, equality and privacy are not exclusively American constitutional ideas but, rather, part and parcel of the global human rights movement" Koh has traced the influence of decisions from foreign courts throughout the history of the U.S. Supreme Court and the American court system.

Critics of this approach argue that citing foreign decisions as legal precedents threatens American sovereignty and "lends itself to manipulation." Other commentators have observed that the "use of such nonbinding sources to bolster legal arguments is a central and uncontroversial tenet of the American judicial process."

On May 12, 2009, the Senate Committee on Foreign Relations voted 12–5 in favor of Koh. After a hold was placed on his nomination, Senate Majority Leader Harry Reid announced on June 22, 2009, that he would invoke cloture on the nomination. On June 24, 2009, the Senate voted 65–31 to end debate on the nomination, paving the way for a full Senate vote the following day. The following day, Koh was confirmed by the Senate in a 62–35 vote. While working in government, Koh took a leave of absence from Yale Law School.

Views on targeted killing

In a March 2010 speech, Koh voiced his strong support for the legality of targeted killing by aerial drone strikes in Pakistan, Yemen, and other countries included by the U.S. government as being within the scope of the war on terror. The State Department's legal adviser said that "U.S. targeting practices, including lethal operations conducted with the use of unmanned aerial vehicles (UAVs)", which the Obama administration has leaned on heavily in its efforts to eliminate al-Qaeda and other terrorist groups in Asia, "comply with all applicable law, including the laws of war", citing the principles of distinction and proportionality. He said that the U.S. adheres to these standards, and takes great care in the "planning and execution to ensure that only legitimate objectives are targeted, and that collateral damage is kept to a minimum."

He said the U.S. is in "an armed conflict with al-Qaeda, the Taliban, and the associated forces", and therefore has the lawful right to use force to protect its citizens "consistent with its inherent right to self-defense" under international law. Koh identified three elements that the U.S. considers when determining whether to authorize a specific targeted drone killing:

Imminence of the threat;
Sovereignty of other States involved; and
Willingness and ability of those States to suppress the threat the target poses.

He also said that the drone strikes against al-Qaeda and its allies were lawful targeted killing, as part of the military action authorized by Congress, and not assassination, which is banned by executive order. Under domestic law, U.S. targeted killings against 9/11-related entities is authorized by the Authorization for Use of Military Force Against Terrorists. The speech earned praise from the editorial board of The Wall Street Journal.

Koh was criticized by lawyer Jennifer Robinson, who represents activist Julian Assange, for addressing a letter to both her and her client. Robinson felt this was in breach of legal custom.

Resignation
On December 7, 2012, the Wall Street Journal reported that Koh was poised to leave his job at the State Department and return to Yale Law School in January 2013 as a law professor.

Publications
 The Trump Administration and International Law, Oxford University Press, 2018.

Lectures
From International to Transnational Law in the Lecture Series of the United Nations Audiovisual Library of International Law.

See also 
 Barack Obama Supreme Court candidates
 List of law clerks of the Supreme Court of the United States (Seat 2)

References

External links

 U.S. State Department's Office of the Legal Adviser and Harold H. Koh's Biography
 

|-

|-

1954 births
Alumni of Magdalen College, Oxford
American legal scholars
American legal writers
American political writers
American politicians of Korean descent
American male non-fiction writers
American diplomats
Clinton administration personnel
Deans of Yale Law School
The Hague Academy of International Law people
Harvard Law School alumni
Hopkins School alumni
International law scholars
Law clerks of the Supreme Court of the United States
Lawyers from Boston
Living people
Marshall Scholars
Obama administration personnel
United States Assistant Secretaries of State
Yale Law School faculty
American university and college faculty deans
South Korean academic administrators
20th-century South Korean educators
21st-century American lawyers
People associated with Covington & Burling
Yale Sterling Professors